Ghaffar Kazmi (born 25 December 1962) is a Pakistani former cricketer. He played 150 first-class matches in a career that spanned 20 years. He is now an umpire and has stood in matches in the 2015–16 Quaid-e-Azam Trophy.

In February 2020, he was named in Pakistan's squad for the Over-50s Cricket World Cup in South Africa. However, the tournament was cancelled during the third round of matches due to the COVID-19 pandemic. In December 2020, he was shortlisted as one of the Umpire of the Year for the 2020 PCB Awards.

References

External links
 

1962 births
Living people
Pakistani cricketers
Pakistani cricket umpires
Zarai Taraqiati Bank Limited cricketers
Lahore cricketers
Rawalpindi cricketers
Pakistan Automobiles Corporation cricketers
Cricketers from Lahore